Daniel Heffernan (born 25 May 1987) is an English footballer who plays as a striker. He has previously played in England, Australia and Indonesia. In 2019, Heffernan returned to England and signed with Whalley Range FC

Career
Born in Manchester, Heffernan started his career at Fletcher Moss Rangers, and played for several semi-professional and non-league English clubs before moving to Australia for a brief spell with Shepparton Soccer Club in the North Eastern Soccer League. After returning to England, he travelled back to Australia as interest in his services became apparent from several Victorian National Premier League clubs, including South Melbourne, Port Melbourne and Green Gully. Heffernan would however sign with Heidelberg United and go on to score 50 league goals for the club, including 32 in the 2014 and 2015 NPL Victoria seasons. Heffernan scored twice for Heidelberg during the 2015 FFA Cup, once in their Round of 32 match against Broadmeadow Magic, and in the Round of 16 clash against Sydney United 58, the latter in which he became the quickest goalscorer in the cup, scoring after just 26 seconds. Heffernan was also part of the Barlow R.C High School football side who became national school champions at Stamford Bridge.

First Professional Contract
Following his impressive performances for Heidelberg in the National Premier Leagues and FFA Cup, A-League club Central Coast Mariners offered a trial by coach Tony Walmsley. After impressing Walmsley with his performances, including a hat-trick in a friendly game against fellow A-League club Western Sydney Wanderers, he was offered a 1-year contract. He made his professional debut for the club in their opening round loss of the 2015-16 A-League season against Brisbane Roar. On 11 April 2016, after seven A-League appearances without a goal for the Mariners, Heffernan was released by the club.

Heffernan signed for the Goulburn Valley Suns in May 2016.

After a spell in Indonesia with Bali United, he later returned to England and re signed for former club Abbey Hey.

References

External links
 

Living people
1987 births
Association football forwards
English footballers
Fletcher Moss Rangers F.C. players
National Premier Leagues players
A-League Men players
Central Coast Mariners FC players
Goulburn Valley Suns FC players
Salford City F.C. players
Altrincham F.C. players
New Mills A.F.C. players
Abbey Hey F.C. players
Bali United F.C. players
Expatriate footballers in Indonesia
Expatriate soccer players in Australia